The Fámjin stone is a runestone located in the church of Fámjin on the Faroe Islands. The stone bears both Latin and Runic letters. The stone is dated to the time after the Faroese reformation in 1538, and proves that runes were used up to as late as the 16th century. It is the youngest of the Faroese runestones.

See also
Sandavágur stone
Kirkjubøur stone

References

Runestones on the Faroe Islands
Suðuroy